Raye Hartmann  (born February 17, 1990) is a Canadian football defensive back who is currently a free agent. He was selected in the fourth round of the 2014 CFL Draft by the Edmonton Eskimos with the 30th overall pick. After he spent 2014 and the start of the 2015 season on the practice roster, Hartmann made his CFL debut on August 6, 2015 against the BC Lions, where he played mostly on the special teams. He attended St. Francis Xavier University where he played CIS football for the X-Men. He won All Star honours in his freshman and sophomore years, his only two years with the X-Men. He joined the roster of the Saskatchewan Roughriders in June 2016.

References 

1990 births
Living people
Canadian football defensive backs
Edmonton Elks players
Sportspeople from Prince George, British Columbia
Players of Canadian football from British Columbia
Players of Canadian football from Ontario
Saskatchewan Roughriders players
St. Francis Xavier X-Men football players
Sportspeople from Mississauga